Grossology (also known as Glurp Attack in Québec) is a Canadian animated action-adventure television series produced by Nelvana and based loosely on the non-fictional children's book series of the same name by Sylvia Branzei.

The show first premiered on YTV in Canada on September 29, 2006. The original run ended on October 24, 2009.

Premise
Ty and Abby are a teenage brother-and-sister crime-fighting team who report to the Bureau of Grossology, a secret government agency whose job is to investigate gross criminals, their gross crimes, and/or various gross phenomena. Each episode of the series follows the pair on adventures based on real scientific facts. Aided by their friend Lab Rat (a tech specialist and a lab researcher), their boss The Director, and their police liaison, The Detective, Ty and Abby work to keep the city safe, all while keeping their identities hidden.

Characters

Main
 Tyler "Ty" Archer (voiced by Michael Cohen): Ty is Abby's younger brother and a hard kid to face. He is very intelligent, possessing a cool, active and analytical mind that takes everything in. He sees himself as a scientist and takes his job as a grossologist very seriously. His goal is to be remembered among the very best within the scientific community. He even owns a chemistry set and does analyses on things he finds (e.g. Hairball's hairballs). He and Lab Rat share many common interests. On the field, Ty pilots the GRS-1 and is great at strategic maneuvers. His quick thinking has saved the day many times. In fact, he is hinted to be the most intelligent of the team, being smarter than Abby and even than Lab Rat. He has a crush on Naomi, who eventually becomes his girlfriend later in the series.
 Abigail "Abby" Archer (voiced by Krystal Meadows): Abby is a Kim Possible-eqsue girl who unravels mysteries so disgusting that no adult will touch them. She is very confident, adventurous, sharp and loves everything gross and slimy. She likes to test her limits to see if there is something that can make even her, the Queen of Squeam, turn green. So far, nothing has come close, although she closely resisted gagging on a few occasions. The only exception was when she unknowingly drank contaminated water and threw up. Despite all of this, she is terribly afraid of leeches. She gets covered in slop the most, and being dirty has yet to affect her really long trademark ponytail. On the field, she is a competent fighter. She holds a severe grudge against not only villains like Lance Boil but also her school rival Paige. Unlike her younger brother Ty, she is athletic and participates in school sports like volleyball. Abby depends on her instincts and feelings at times, which occasionally clouds her judgment. She shares ownership of her beloved pet kitten, Hairball, with Ty.
 Paul "Lab Rat" Squirfenherder (voiced by M. Christian Heywood): Lab Rat, a former student of the school and a former delinquent who now is the older colleague of Ty and Abby, working as Bureau of Grossology's tech support assistant He is a lab worker who make different sorts of gadgets and search for various scientific informations into the computer in order to aid Ty and Abby on their missions. Lab Rat suffers from agoraphobia, which prevents him from leaving the Gag Lab unless absolutely necessary, but instead spent his time doing lab work. This is what earned him the nickname "Lab Rat," which he prefers to his real name. He has a pet rat named Hermes, who he treats as his best friend. He also has poor personal hygiene, Abby often jokes that he stinks due to the fact that bathing is not one of his favorite activities.
 The Director (voiced by Paul O'Sullivan): The Director is the head of the Bureau of Grossology and gives the Grossologists their repulsive assignments, often in a state of panic. He is incredibly squeamish and terrified by the slightest hint of anything gross. In spite of this, he is known to arrogantly enter the scene after the crime is solved and take all the credit, claiming that Abby and Ty's success is because of his "great leadership skills". Abby and Ty see right through his farce and make sure his ego is kept in check, which isn't hard to do since the crime scenes often unnerve the Director anyway. He has on one known occasion gone into the field by himself to search for his missing agents.

Villains
 Insectiva (voiced by Lili Francks): She was once a promising young university student who wanted to study entomology (the study of insects) until she discovered how insects are treated by science: captured and dissected. Now, armed with all sorts of bugs, she pursues an insect agenda, to wipe all people off the planet so bugs can rule again. She, like many insects, can't get past windows, therefore she is continuously running into them. She began a romantic relationship with Sloppy Joe in the Valentine's Day episode "Pucker Up". She also has a twin sister, Arachnidia, who is also her rival.
 Real Name: Cara Chitin
 First Appearance: Episode 1 ("Queen for a Day")
 Cara Chitin's last name is based on chitin, what insects' exoskeletons are made of.
 The Slim Slime Man (voiced by Neil Crone): A bitter old sewer worker, who abnormally fused with a living slime mold while working in the sewers one day, becoming a strange giant slime creature with a ghoulish skull-like head seen inside. As he gets more powerful, he aims to cover the surface world with living slime molds.
 Real Name: Slim
 First Appearance: Episode 2 ("The Slim Slime Man")
 Fartor (voiced by Sean Cullen): Fifteen years ago, he was just an ordinary kid, until his older brother Gary tortured him by stuffing him under the bedsheets and farting in there. During those fifteen years, his lungs adapted to the gases in farts. Like a fish out of water, clean air is poison to him, so he breathes toxic gases in a dome that he wears on his body. There was only one thing Fartor wanted... revenge on his brother.
 Real Name: Larry
 First Appearance: Episode 3 ("Fartzilla")
 Sloppy Joe (voiced by George Buza): After discovering that a whiff of his stink was enough to render people unconscious, Joe vowed to never let a drop of water, soap, or deodorant touch his skin again, and turned to an easy life of crime. His plan: go from filthy to filthy rich. He uses his extremely filthy body as his weapon. When clean he is shown to be an albino. Insectiva is his girlfriend as of the Valentine's Day episode "Pucker Up".
 First Appearance: Episode 4 ("The Perfect Stink")
 Real Name: Joseph Puglowski
 The Scab Fairy (voiced by Jessica Holmes): A crazed former beauty queen who was traumatized over a small cut to her shoulder, ending her career. Not seen since then, she used her exceptional degree in dermatology and mythology to create a high-tech dragonfly-winged suit made of scabs and takes the identity of the Scab Fairy, based on a Tooth Fairy-like myth figure that collects scabs (rather than teeth). She is armed with a high-tech wand that removes scabs from people's wounds and inflicts them on others. Her ultimate obsession is to inflict scabs on anyone pretty, as revenge for the loss of her old beauty queen career.
 Real Name: Helena Globin
 First Appearance: Episode 5 ("The Scab Fairy")
 Helena Globin's name is a pun on the word hemoglobin, a protein found in red blood cells.
 Lance Boil (voiced by Juan Chioran): He was once a successful Grossologist; however, he envied The Director's authority. Boil tried to pull a coup, using a "prototype shrink-ray." Ty had tinkered with the weapon though, and Lance ended up blasting himself and shrinking in a somewhat lopsided manner (small body; large, misshapen, pus-filled head). Although horrified at first, Lance comes to be very proud of his boil.  Banished from the team, he decided to use his skills for evil, with one goal in his twisted head: revenge against all Grossologists, especially Abby and Ty. He is also the person responsible for mentoring Abby and Ty, helping hone their fighting and investigation skills, and tutoring them personally in Grossology, human and animal anatomy, biology, and chemistry to become the Grossologists they are today. 
 Real Name: Lance Boil
 First Appearance: Episode 6 ("When Ya Gotta Go")
 His name references the medical term "lancing a boil".
 Hagfish: Giant, mutated hagfish that can breathe air and move on land. They are former bottom dwellers that were farmed and gene spliced with conger eel DNA, making them larger and hungrier. They eat fish and soon threaten the town's whole food stocks, leaving a trail of slime wherever they go. The lead hagfish has a tag on it and like all fish, they are also afraid of cats.
 First Appearance: Episode 8 ("Go Fish")
 Keith Van Kobbler (voiced by Pat Mastroianni): A popular and undefeated young basketball player, and Abby's former idol. Calls himself "VK" for short, and always refers to himself in the third person. He endorsed the "KVK-1" brand super-sneakers, which have been a runaway success, but after a short while, all wearers (including VK's opposing players, up-and-coming basketball players) suffer a severe case of athlete's foot. After examining the KVK-1 sneakers in the case, Ty and Lab Rat suspect VK himself to be the culprit, while Abby has difficulty accepting their suspicion. As it turns out, VK is indeed the culprit, with a twisted method behind his fame; he single-handedly manufactured the KVK-1 sneakers for mass consumption, and spiked them with fungus (while wearing a non-spiked "Deluxe Edition" pair for himself, of course), so that everyone will have athlete's foot, and most of all, eliminate the competition, so that he will be the only basketball player in the world. His weapon is a high-tech "Wrecking Ball" basketball.
 First Appearance: Episode 9 ("It's Gotta Be the Shoes")
 Mr. Fowler (voiced by Derek McGrath): He is the custodian at Ringworm Junior High School. He is small, timid, shy, afraid of Paige, and wears oversized glasses. Always hums the song "4 and 20 Black Birds Baked In a Pie." He grew tired of cleaning up the excess pigeon poop around the school, so he built a giant mechanical owl suit, with which he captures pigeons and plots to put them in a pie to bake them.
 First Appearance: Episode 10 ("Owl Most Foul")
 Kid Rot (voiced by Travis Ferris): After a science experiment mishap while trying to find a cure for foods going bad or rotting, young boy Chester gains a "rotting touch," which causes all organic materials (except for human DNA) to rot with a single touch (eventually evolving into projecting rotting energy blasts and massive bursts of rotting energy), and also gives off a horrible smell. He becomes a new student at Ringworm Junior High School, and causes chaos upon his arrival, with a concerned Abby and Ty trying to cure him (Abby initially had feelings for him, much to Ty's suspicion). But Chester's rotting powers come with a terrible price, as a parasite living inside of him takes over his body and mind, giving him a mutated appearance and a twisted personality, and christens himself "Kid Rot", becoming a formidable and diabolical foe for the Grossology team. Worse, he has a psychotic infatuation for Abby (who ultimately hates him, at least his prevalent Kid Rot persona), and will stop at nothing to win her heart, even going as far as to rot the entire world! His rotting powers used to be an excellent fertilizer (in a way making his science experiment a success), but the second time they met, his powers have evolved to where they just kill whatever they touch. The last time we saw Kid Rot, he was engulfed in rot he had created. Abby and Ty gave up looking for him but as the episode is about to end we see a hand (presumably Kid Rot's) sticking out from the rot and as a leaf lands on it, it's grabbed by the hand.
 Real Name: Chester
 First Appearance: Episode 13 ("Kid Rot")
 Patrick (voiced by Julie Lemieux) 
 First Appearance: Episode 17 ("Survival of the Grossest")
 Dr. Cornelius Colon (voiced by Peter Keleghan): A mad proctologist, who plots to engulf the world in a gigantic colon, starting with Ringworm Junior High School (on the last day before its Summer vacation), to take revenge on people for unsympathetically making fun of him for his unfortunate surname. He also has giant tapeworms as his henchmen.
 First Appearance: Episode 18 ("School's Grossed Out for Summer")
 Far-Ty: Ty as a temporary villain. Feeling he's not needed after Abby showed him up several times, Ty, trying to overcompensate for himself behind her back, was captured by Fartor, who was in the midst of planning yet another full-scale fart attack on the world. He exposes Ty to the same deadly gases that transformed him, using a special process to speed up the transformation. Now, Ty, as Far-Ty, becomes Fartor's greatest asset in carrying out his dastardly plan. And just as Fartor plotted revenge on his older brother Gary, Far-Ty carried out a twisted revenge on his older sister Abby. Thankfully, Ty is cured of this transformation.
 Real Name: Ty Archer
 First Appearance: Episode 20 ("Silent But Deadly, Part 1")
 Frankenbooger: A giant monster made of nose mucus stolen by Sloppy Joe (using a suction gun), who simply wanted to make a "boogerman" with said mucus (much like a snowman). Abby and Ty confront Sloppy Joe, and in the process, inadvertently cause an electrical accident that brings the "boogerman" to life. The monster sucks mucus out of people's noses, and the more he consumes, the larger he gets. Its only weakness is dirt particles (just like any mucus), which cause him to not only dry up, but decrease in size.
 First Appearance: Episode 24 ("Frankenbooger")
 Darko Crevasse (voiced by Julian Richings): A gothic caped villain whose eyesight is accustomed to darkness, and therefore must wear dark glasses. He summons a huge flock of bats to drop guano on anyone who opposes him. As he cannot stand light, his ultimate plan is to plunge the city into eternal darkness. In the Halloween episode "Night of the Living Roadkill", Paige commented that he was Goth, much to his annoyance.
 First Appearance: Episode 23 ("Lights Out")
 Sarah Senia (voiced by Jayne Eastwood): A lady whose DNA structure was crossed with that of plants. Has leaves and tendrils around her body. Plotted to use giant carnivorous plants to attack the city, and ultimately, the world.
 First Appearance: Episode 25 ("A New Leaf")
 Arachnidia (voiced by Maria Vacratsis): Insectiva's twin sister. Unlike Insectiva, she loves arachnids, as her name suggests. She and Insectiva have a bitter rivalry, and both pit their own respective arthropods against each other, with catastrophic results. She is the gothic version of Insectiva and her hairstyle is a big double-knob ponytail with the tip shaped like a scorpion stinger .
 First Appearance: Episode 27 ("Sinister Rivalry")
 Frederick Follicle (voiced by Stephen Ouimette): A hair dresser who doesn't like to change styles. After getting kicked out of a job, he went underground doing biological experiments, and an accident ended up transforming every follicle of hair on his body into super-powered living hair.
 First Appearance: Episode 31 ("Hairless Whispers")
 Roger Pink-Eye (voiced by Lyon Smith): A kid with a pink eye. He is curious about Ty and Abby's extra-curricular activities, and thus sets off to find the truth about his classmates' secret identities, using various attempts to do so, but all of them end in failure. In the second season trilogy (Pinkeye and The Brain, Pinkeye's Revenge Part 1, Pinkeye's Revenge Part 2), he teams up with Lance Boil (after successfully capturing him) to find out Ty and Abby's secret. He eventually becomes a Grossologist, but he is fired/quits after his plan backfires with Lance betraying him. He then loses his memories of the events.
 First Appearance: Episode 33 ("Mold Monster")
 Basso Profondo (voiced by Ben Campbell): A disgraced opera star, who was once part of the Three Baritones. He's back for revenge, but this time he's singing a whole new tune; in other words, he's now a burping star.
 First Appearance: Episode 39 ("Ain't Over Till the Fat Man Sings")
 Gary Gumdrop (voiced by Adrian Truss): People call him the ultimate candy man, but he's just a crazy man with a big sweet tooth and a lot of rotten teeth. His plan is to make super tooth-rotting candy, pretending that they'll take care of your teeth, and distribute them to everyone, so he won't be the only one with a rotten mouth and a large craving for candy.
 First Appearance: Episode 40 ("Candy Isn't Dandy")
Gundy McGoober (voiced by Bruce Pirrie): Tired of campers bringing their new electronic devices with them, Gundy uses mutated worms to scare away people from his lake. 
 First Appearance: Episode  42 ("Squirm")
 Evil Clone Abby (voiced by Krystal Meadows): She is the creation of Roger Pink-Eye and Lance Boil, used as part of a  scheme to get Abby fired so that they can take over the Bureau of Grossology. She is made from a combination of human DNA and rat DNA. She attacked the city with an army of rats, and later infiltrated the Gag Lab and fired Ty and Lab Rat.
 First Appearance: Episode 46 ("Pink-Eye's Revenge (Part I)")
 Slitherbuddies: Genetically modified reptiles that start out cuddly but grow to be monstrous and vicious.
 First Appearance: Episode 48 ("Fang's A Lot")

Supporting
 Harvey & Petunia Archer (voiced by Richard Binsley and Karen Hines, respectively): Abby and Ty's father and mother, respectively. Both are shown to be gullible, and as such, are completely unaware of their children's secret jobs as Grossologists. Harvey manages the city's water treatment plant while Petunia teaches entomology. Petunia has a fear of heights as shown in the episode "Squirmed".
 The Detective (voiced by Danny Wells): A gruff, burly police detective, who occasionally works with Abby and Ty on cases, and is the only outsider who knows their secret. He bears more than a strong resemblance to Detective Dick Gumshoe from the Phoenix Wright series of games.
 Mr. Scheffer (voiced by Chad DeRohgth): An often nervous and uptight teacher at Ringworm Junior High School. He has been noted to teach science (Silent But Deadly: Part 1) and direct plays (When Ya Gotta Go).
 Paige Logan (voiced by Melissa Altro): A popular but very snobbish girl at Ringworm Junior High, and Abby's bitter rival. However, as seen in "New Recruits", she was once actually nice to her. Her father is very rich, and her favorite color is pink. She has been noted several times throughout the second season to have a crush on a blond boy named Rudy.
 Naomi (voiced by Lauren Collins): A shy and gentle girl at Ringworm Junior High, and Ty's love interest. She takes ballet. She also has three incredibly jockish brothers, as seen in the episode "When Allergies Attack" when Ty went on a family picnic with her. It was also noticed in the previously mentioned episode that she has a long list of allergies.
Emily (voiced by Leah Pinsent): A gothic nurse who is an expert on leeches.

Production
 Back when the series was in development in 2004, the planned series was somewhat different. Background designer Brad Graham was originally slated to do the character designs and backgrounds. The character designs looked completely different, and had more of a conventional "abstract" look like most modern kids' cartoons, but many of Graham's elements remained in the final version. The more diverse Grossology team lineup consisted of Abby and Ty (who were still the main characters, only Abby had pigtails rather than the long trademark ponytail), Nigel Stodding (a British kid fashioned like 1960s secret agent Harry Palmer), Lab Rat (who was an overweight Caucasian boy, but still had Hermes, who looked somewhat identical to the final version), and a weirder assortment of kids including Pink Eye (a beatnik boy; the basis for the villain Roger Pink-Eye), Creepy Crawly (a goth girl with spiders, who may have been the basis for the adult villainess Insectiva.), Sloppy Joe (a dirty spud-shaped kid, who ultimately became an adult villain for the series) and Colin Polyp (A bulb-headed kid who may have evolved into the adult villain Dr. Cornelius Colon in the final series). Abby and Ty still went to Ringworm Junior High School (which looked like a more classic-style school than the more modern one in the series), and the Gag Lab was originally a more complex underground secret base called the Grossotorium. Abby and Ty did not wear Slime Suits at this point.
 According to M. Christian Heywood, the voice of Lab Rat, upon discovering the original Lab Rat design, his initial audition for the character was a modified impression of Otacon from Metal Gear Solid. However, the director insisted for him to try the audition more close to his natural voice albeit with some Chris Tucker influence; in which he complied. Although the directors' initially wanted a genuine child actor to play the character, the actor was fired from the project and not only did Heywood won the role but the characters' final design was re-worked and modeled after Heywood himself.

Episodes
 Airdates are from original Canadian broadcasts on YTV.

Season 1 (2006–07)

Season 2 (2008–09)
Although Season 2 never aired on Discovery Kids or its successor, Hub Network, in the United States, this season aired years later on Qubo. Most episodes can be found on YouTube. The last 2 episodes didn't air until 2017. "Pucker Up" and "Let Them Eat Fruitcake" both haven't aired in Canada yet, but they have aired in Australia.

Telecast and home media
Premiering on the YTV network in Canada on September 29, 2006 with the final episode ended on October 24, 2009. the show was also aired on Discovery Kids/The Hub (now Discovery Family) in the U.S. on January 13, 2007 with repeats until June 2011. It also aired on Jetix on June 2, 2007, and Pop Max from September 15, 2008, in the United Kingdom, and on ABC in Australia in December 2007. The show aired with repeats on Qubo from 2016 through 2020. The show was formerly aired on Nickelodeon Canada, and now with repeats air on Disney XD Canada. The show is now streaming on the premium Amazon Prime and Pluto TV.

The first official DVD release for this series was issued in Australia in July 2008. Two volumes are available so far:

 Grossology – Vol. 1: The Perfect Stink (Region 4 – Australia, PAL)
 Released: 9 July 2008
 Price: A$17.97
 Label: Magna Pacific
 Specs: Widescreen (16:9 Enhanced), Stereo (Dolby Digital 2.0)
 Running Time: 132 minutes
 Special Features: N/A
 Episodes Included: "Queen For A Day", "The Slim Slime Man", "Fartzilla", "The Perfect Stink", "This Scab's for You", "When You Gotta Go"
 Grossology – Vol. 2: Yack Attack (Region 4 – Australia, PAL)
 Released: 9 July 2008
 Price: A$17.97
 Label: Magna Pacific
 Specs: Widescreen (16:9 Enhanced), Stereo (Dolby Digital 2.0)
 Running Time: 110 minutes
 Special Features: N/A
 Episodes Included: "Club Parasites", "Go Fish", "Gotta Be The Shoes", "Owl Most Fowl", "Yack Attack",

In September 2008, they saw the first official DVD release in Canada. One volume is available so far:

 Grossology: The Perfect Stink (Region 1 – USA/Canada, NTSC)
 Released: September 23, 2008
 Price: CAN $15.99
 ASIN: B001CQS7C4
 Label: Phase 4 Films/Kaboom! Entertainment
 Specs: Widescreen (16:9 Enhanced), Stereo (Dolby Digital 2.0)
 Running Time: 90 minutes
 Special Features: Bonus episode of Di-Gata Defenders
 Episodes Included: "Queen For A Day", "The Slim Slime Man", "Fartzilla", "The Perfect Stink".

References

External links

 Grossology on Nick Canada (WayBackMachine)
 
 Original Grossology development art by Bradford I. Graham

Episode list using the default LineColor
2006 Canadian television series debuts
2009 Canadian television series endings
2000s Canadian animated television series
2000s Canadian comic science fiction television series
Canadian children's animated action television series
Canadian children's animated adventure television series
Canadian children's animated comic science fiction television series
Canadian children's animated science fantasy television series
English-language television shows
YTV (Canadian TV channel) original programming
Canadian television shows based on children's books
Animated television series about siblings
Teen animated television series
Television series by Nelvana
Television shows set in Ontario
Middle school television series